Radoniq Lake or Radonjić Lake (/ Radonjićko jezero) is a lake in Kosovo. After only Gazivoda Lake, it is the second largest in the territory of Kosovo, at 5.62 km2.

In 1998, the lake was the site of the Lake Radonjić massacre.

Back in the 80‘s, there used to be a town under this lake. However during the process of making this artificial lake, the town had to be sunk under it. The residents had, of course, moved from the town once this happened. During different times of the year, once the tide is low, the very top of a church can be seen, as it remains still intact. It is a widely known fact to the people around the lake. However not many visitors know the whole story of this lake.

Notes

References

Lakes of Kosovo
Lakes of Serbia